Yamini may refer to:

 Yamini (given name), an Indian given name (including a list of people with the name)
 Yamini (film), a 1973 Malayalam-language film
 Yamini (music festival), a Bangalore music festival
 Yamini dynasty, another name for the Ghaznavid dynasty of southern Asia
 Tarikh Yamini or Kitab i Yamini, an Arabic history of the reigns of the Ghaznavid rulers Sebuktigin and Mahmud up to 1020
 Yami, the first woman in Vedic beliefs, sometimes called Yāmīnī

See also
Amini (disambiguation)
Yamin (disambiguation)